North Carolina Highway 222 (NC 222) is a primary state highway in the U.S. state of North Carolina. The highway traverses between Emit and Belvoir, connecting the rural towns of Kenly, Fremont, Eureka, Stantonsburg, Saratoga, Fountain, and Falkland.

Route description
NC 222 is a two-lane rural highway that traverses  through mostly farmland in eastern North Carolina. Beginning at NC 231 east of Emit, it travels southeast towards Kenly, passing by Aycock Birthplace along the way. At Kenly, it goes east to Fremont connecting with Interstate 795 (I-795) and US 117 there. Heading northeast, it goes through Eureka and Stantonsburg, reaching I-587 and US 264 near Saratoga. Heading easterly, it connects with US 258 in Fountain. After Falkland, NC 222 ends at NC 33 in Belvoir.

History
NC 222 was established in 1934 traversing between US 301/NC 22 in Kenly, to NC 58 near Lindell. In 1938, NC 222 was rerouted at Eureka to NC 58 in Stantonsburg; its old alignment was downgraded to secondary roads. In 1948, NC 222 was extended west on new primary routing to NC 42; the following year it extended again to its current western terminus at NC 231. Between 1963-1968, NC 222 was rerouted through Stantonsburg. In 1978, NC 222 was extended east to NC 33 in Belvoir.

Junction list

References

External links

NCRoads.com: N.C. 222

222
Transportation in Johnston County, North Carolina
Transportation in Wayne County, North Carolina
Transportation in Wilson County, North Carolina
Transportation in Pitt County, North Carolina